Wat Aranyik is a historic temple in Phitsanulok, Thailand.

History
Wat Aranyik was constructed during the Sukhothai Period.

Features
On the temple grounds, there is a modern temple with a monastery and modern temple buildings.  There is also a large area of ruins where the old temple of the Sukhothai period once stood. Still standing from the original temple's construction are a historic chedi and a number of Buddha images. A unique feature of the temple is that it is surrounded by moats.

References

Aranyik